Union Township is one of twelve townships in Porter County, Indiana. As of the 2010 census, its population was 8,811.

History
Union Township was organized in 1836, and named for the federal union of the United States.

Cities and towns
The township has no incorporated communities. Wheeler, located in the northern part of the township on State Route 130, continues to be an important community.

Education
The township is served by the Union Township School Corporation.  Its high school is Wheeler High School near the community of Wheeler.

References

External links

 Indiana Township Association
 United Township Association of Indiana

Townships in Porter County, Indiana
Townships in Indiana
1836 establishments in Indiana
Populated places established in 1836